was the penname of a husband-and-wife manga artist duo. Morishige is most well known as the creator of Hanaukyo Maid Team and Koi Koi Seven, both of which have been adapted into various anime series.

On July 3, 2020, Akita Shoten announced that one of the members of Morishige had died on June 30, 2020.

Works
Fudanshizumu: Fudanshugi
Hanaukyo Maid Team (14 volumes, Akita Shoten)
Jūrin (蹂躙, Sakuranbō Shobō, August 1998)
Kodomo no Mori (Oakla Shuppan, January 1998)
Kodomo no Mori: Kanketsuhen (Oakla Shuppan, November 1999)
Koi Koi Seven (9 volumes, Akita Shoten)
Sakura Sakura (12 June 2012 to 12 September 2015 in Bessatsu Shōnen Magazine)
Suzaku (Takeshobo)

References

External links
 Official blog

Manga artists from Ibaraki Prefecture
Year of birth missing
2020 deaths